Rabbi Yehuda Kroizer (born May 21, 1955 in Jerusalem) a son of Avraham and Mina and is the Chief Rabbi of Mitzpe Yericho and dean of Yeshivat Haraayon Hayehudi in Jerusalem.

Kroizer studied at Yeshivat Hakotel where he received his rabbinical ordination and became the Chief Rabbi of Mitzpe Yericho in 1982. In 1987 he became the Rosh Yeshiva of Yeshivat Haraayon Hayehudi (English: The Yeshiva of the Jewish Idea) in Jerusalem. His son, Yitzhak Kroizer, became a member of the Knesset for Otzma Yehudit in 2023.

References

External links
Video Classes by Rabbi Yehuda Kroizer

1955 births
Living people
Israeli rabbis
Chief rabbis of Israel